Gary Foster may refer to:
Gary Evans Foster (1894–1951), US soldier during World War One
Gary Foster (musician) (born 1936), American instrumentalist
Gary D. Foster, British phytopathologist